Mastax liebkei is a species of beetle in the family Carabidae with restricted distribution in the Democratic Republic of Congo.

References

Mastax liebkei
Beetles of the Democratic Republic of the Congo
Beetles described in 1937
Endemic fauna of the Democratic Republic of the Congo